William Boyd Dunlap was a former Democratic member of the Pennsylvania State Senate.

He worked as a riverboat captain. He was a delegate to the 1876 Democratic National Convention. He represented the 46th senatorial district in the Pennsylvania State Senate from 1891 to 1894.

William B. Dunlap Mansion, his home in Bridgewater, Pennsylvania, is on the National Register of Historic Places.

References

Democratic Party Pennsylvania state senators
People from Beaver, Pennsylvania
Sea captains
Year of death missing
Year of birth missing